Florida College System Activities Association Incorporated (FCSAA) is the governing body for all extracurricular activities of the member schools of the Florida College System. Activities include athletics, Brain Bowl, forensics, music, publications, theater, and student government.  The athletic programs fall under The NJCAA Region 8. There are currently 28 schools in the FCSAA. In the 1960s, twelve historically black institutions were merged into other colleges within their districts, with full integration being achieved by 1966.

Schools

Student Government
FCSAA's student government division is known as the Florida College System Student Government Association (FCSSGA).

Dealaney Allen is the 2019–2020 President of the FCSSGA. In this role, Allen and her executive board represent the one million students at Florida State and Community colleges before the Florida Legislature.

See also
Florida Student Association, Inc.
National Junior College Athletic Association

References

External links
 
 Athletics website
 Student Government website
 FCSAA's "Organization Profile" at the National Center for Charitable Statistics

National Junior College Athletic Association
Florida College System
1975 establishments in Florida
Student political organizations